Westbourne House School is an independent preparatory school 1½ miles east of Chichester, West Sussex, England.  It is co-educational and serves around 450 boarding and day-school pupils from ages 3–13. The headmaster is Martin Barker.

History 
In the 1990s the school was one of nearly 400 schools used to educate the children of British diplomats posted overseas.

Notable alumni 

 Tom Bradby, journalist and author
 Marcus Brigstocke, comedian
 Nick Clarke, presenter and journalist
 Holly Colvin, England cricketer
 Alastair Mackenzie, actor

References

External links 
 Official site

Education in Chichester
Boarding schools in West Sussex
Educational institutions established in 1907
Preparatory schools in West Sussex
1907 establishments in England